Banksia pulchella, commonly known as teasel banksia, is a species of small shrub that is endemic to the south-west of Western Australia. It has smooth grey bark, linear leaves and golden-brown flowers in short, cylindrical heads and inconspicuous follicles.

Description
The leaves have a sharp point on the tip. There are small involucral bracts at the base of the head but that fall off as the flowers develop. Flowering occurs in January, March or May to October.

Taxonomy and naming
Banksia pulchella was first formally described by Robert Brown who published the description in Transactions of the Linnean Society of London. Brown's specimens were collected at locations along the south coast of Western Australia, but in 1981, Alex George chose the specimens that Brown collected at Lucky Bay as the lectotype. The specific epithet (pulchella) is from the Latin pulchellus meaning "pretty", probably referring to the flowers.

George placed B. oreophila in subgenus Banksia, section Oncostylis, series Abietinae.

Distribution and habitat
Teasel banksia grows in tall shrubland and kwongan and occurs on the south coast of Western Australia from Culham Inlet in the Fitzgerald River National Park and east to Israelite Bay.

Conservation status
This banksia is classed as "not threatened" by the Western Australian Government Department of Parks and Wildlife.

Use in horticulture
Seeds do not require any treatment, and take 17 to 48 days to germinate.

References

pulchella
Eudicots of Western Australia
Taxa named by Robert Brown (botanist, born 1773)
Plants described in 1810